Pandorea baileyana, commonly known as large-leaved wonga vine, is a species of flowering plant in the family Bignoniaceae and is endemic to eastern Australia. It is a woody climber with pinnate leaves that have seven to nine egg-shaped leaflets, and relatively small cream-coloured flowers that are pink inside.

Description
Pandorea baileyana is a woody climber. Flowering occurs from September to March.

Taxonomy
This species was first formally described in 1896 by Joseph Maiden and Richard Thomas Baker, who gave it the name Tecome baileyana in the Proceedings of the Linnean Society of New South Wales from specimens collected near Mullumbimby Creek by William Baeuerlen. In 1927, Cornelius van Steenis changed the name to Pandorea baileyana. The specific epithet (baileyana) honours Frederick Manson Bailey.

Distribution and habitat
Pandorea baileyana grows in rainforest from south-eastern Queensland to Minyon Falls in northern New South Wales.

References

baileyana
Vines
Lamiales of Australia
Flora of New South Wales
Flora of Queensland
Plants described in 1896
Taxa named by Joseph Maiden
Taxa named by Richard Thomas Baker